Stature may refer to:

 Human stature, the distance from the bottom of the feet to the top of the head in a human body, standing erect
 Reputation, social opinion about an entity
 Respect, feeling of regard for someone or something
 Stature (comics), fictional character